The Togo national under-17 football team represents Togo in association football at this age level. They are controlled by the Fédération Togolaise de Football.

Competitive record

FIFA U-17 World Cup
 1985 - Did not qualify
 1987 - Did not qualify
 1989 - Withdrew
 1991 - Did not qualify
 1993 - Did not qualify
 1995 - Did not qualify
 1997 - Did not enter
 1999 - Did not qualify
 2001 - Withdrew
 2003 - Withdrew
 2005 - Did not enter
 2007 - Group Stage
 2009 - Did not enter
 2011 - Withdrew
 2013 - Did not enter
 2015 - Did not qualify
 2017 - Did not enter
 2019 - Did Not Qualify
 2021 - To be determined

CAF U-16 and U-17 World Cup Qualifiers
 1985 - Did not qualify
 1987 - Did not qualify
 1989 - Withdrew
 1991 - Did not qualify
 1993 - Did not qualify

African U-17 Championship
 1995 - Did not qualify
 1997 - Did not enter
 1999 - Did not qualify
 2001 - Withdrew
 2003 - Withdrew
 2005 - Did not enter
 2007 -  Runners-Up
 2009 - Did not enter
 2011 - Withdrew
 2013 - Did not enter
 2015 - Did not qualify
 2017 - Did not enter

Togo national football team
African national under-17 association football teams